Albert Sarkisyan (born 14 August 1963, in Yerevan) is an Armenian professional football manager and a former player.

Career
Sarkisyan made 187 appearances in the Soviet Top League for FC Ararat Yerevan and FC Dynamo Kyiv.

He is currently managing Alashkert-2 who play at the Armenian First League as the reserve team of Alashkert FC.

Honours
 Soviet Top League bronze: 1989.

References

1963 births
Living people
Footballers from Yerevan
Soviet footballers
Armenian footballers
Soviet Armenians
Armenian expatriate footballers
Armenian football managers
Expatriate footballers in Lithuania
Armenian expatriate sportspeople in Lithuania
FC Ararat Yerevan players
FC Dynamo Kyiv players
FK Panerys Vilnius players
Soviet Top League players
Ulisses FC managers
FC Alashkert managers
Association football defenders